is a 2020 Japanese science fiction thriller drama streaming television series based on the manga by Haro Aso. The series was directed by Shinsuke Sato. It stars Kento Yamazaki and Tao Tsuchiya as allies trapped in an abandoned Tokyo forced to compete in dangerous games, the type and difficulty represented by playing cards, to extend "visas" that, if expired, result in the player's execution by lasers being shot from the sky.

The series' first season was announced in July 2019 and filmed from August to December 2019. Set locations included Shibuya districts and a green screen studio replica of Shibuya Crossing. The show's visual effects were produced in an international collaboration between Japan's Digital Frontier and teams from Singapore, the United States, and India. The musical score was composed by Yutaka Yamada, who had collaborated with Sato.

The first season premiered on the Netflix streaming service on December 10, 2020, and received positive reviews from critics, who praised the action sequences, direction, and acting. They compared the show to many entries in the survival genre, including the films Battle Royale (2000) and Cube (1997). The first season's strong performance and high viewership in many countries resulted in Netflix renewing the series two weeks after its premiere; the second season was released on December 22, 2022.

Cast and characters

Main

 Kento Yamazaki as Ryōhei Arisu:A video game-obsessed man who "doesn't fit in with his family". He teams up with Usagi while in the Borderlands and later develops romantic feelings for her.
 Tao Tsuchiya as Yuzuha Usagi:A mountain climber who was transported into the empty city of Tokyo shortly after the death of her father, whom she deeply respected. She teams up with Arisu while in the Borderlands and later develops romantic feelings for him.
 Nijirō Murakami as Shuntarō Chishiya:A mysterious, quiet, and sly player who teams up with Kuina to steal Hatter's deck of cards, believing that a full deck would transport them out of the empty city. He later becomes interested in Arisu and Usagi after helping them escape a game of "tag". Before arriving in the Borderlands, he was a medical student.
 Ayaka Miyoshi as Ann Rizuna:An executive member of "the Beach" who wins difficult games through rational thinking, later becoming an important ally and friend to Arisu and his group. Before arriving in the Borderlands, she was a forensic scientist for the police.
 Dori Sakurada as Suguru Niragi:A young yet dangerous member of "the Beach". He is described as being "aggressive due to his complicated past" and is part of "the Militants". Before arriving in the Borderlands, he was often bullied by other students at his high school.
 Aya Asahina as Hikari Kuina:A close friend of Chishiya, whom she helps steal Hatter's deck of cards. A former clothing shop clerk, Kuina is revealed to be transgender in a flashback in episode 7, in which she was disowned by her father.

Recurring
 Yūki Morinaga as Chōta Segawa:A highly religious IT technician and friend of Arisu and Karube. Chōta severely burns his leg while participating in a game titled "Dead or Alive", and as a result, slows down his friends while recovering. In season 2, he makes many appearances in flashbacks, and in the last episode, he and Karube encourage Arisu to enjoy his life and live it to the fullest.
 Keita Machida as Daikichi Karube:A bartender and close friend to Arisu and Chōta. Before being transported into the empty city, Karube was preparing to propose to a woman he worked with at a bar, who happened to be his boss's lover. In season 2, he makes many appearances in flashbacks, and in the last episode, he and Chota encourage Arisu to enjoy his life and live it to the fullest.
 Sho Aoyagi as Morizono Aguni:A strong fighter and Hatter's best friend, Aguni is first introduced as an important member of "the Beach". He is in charge of a violent group named "the Militants". After leaving the Beach, he becomes an important ally to Arisu towards the end of the face-card games.
 Nobuaki Kaneko as Takeru Danma / Hatter:The leader and founder of "the Beach", a hotel inhabited by dozens of players. His main goal is to collect all the playing cards given to players for winning games. After his death in season 1, he often appears as a ghost to Aguni during the events of season 2.
 Riisa Naka as Mira Kanō:A mysterious woman with an "elegant presence", and an executive member of "the Beach". She is revealed to be the Queen of Hearts in the second season and the last enemy of Arisu and Usagi in the Borderlands.
 Yūtarō Watanabe as Kōdai Tatta:A former car mechanic who is saved by Arisu during a game and later becomes a member of "the Beach"; in season 2, he joins Arisu's group. Before arriving in the Borderlands, his mistake caused his co-worker to lose a hand.
 Kina Yazaki as Momoka Inoue:A member of "the Beach", a 'game dealer', and Asahi's best friend.
 Tsuyoshi Abe as Keiichi Kuzuryū:An executive member of "the Beach". In the second season, he is revealed to be the King of Diamonds, and Chishiya participates in his game. Before arriving in the Borderlands, he was a lawyer who was dissatisfied with the outlook of human life and the morality of others, particularly those in positions of power.  
 Yūhei Ōuchida as Takuma:An injured player in the Four of Clubs game: Distance. In a flashback, he was revealed to have helped Kuzuryū in a game.

Season 1
 Shuntarō Yanagi as Takatora Samura / the Last Boss:A strange man and dangerous member of "the Beach", the Last Boss has his face covered in tattoos and carries around a katana to intimidate members. He is also part of "the Militants"
 Ayame Misaki as Saori Shibuki:The first person Arisu and his friends encounter while in the deserted city. At first, Shibuki is presented as an experienced player who helps the group get past their first game. However, she is later revealed to be manipulative in order to get what she wants.
 Mizuki Yoshida as Asahi Kujō:A member of "the Beach", a 'game dealer', and Momoka's best friend.

Season 2
 Tomohisa Yamashita as Ginji Kyuma:A band frontman and the King of Clubs, who is challenged by Arisu's group in the game "Osmosis".
 Ryōhei Shima as Sogo Shitara:A former member of Kyuma's band and his team-mate in the Osmosis game.
 Alisa Urahama as Uta Kisaragi:A former member of Kyuma's band and his teammate in the Osmosis game.
 Eishin Hayashida as Takumi Maki:A former member of Kyuma's band and his teammate in the Osmosis game.
 Eita Okuno as Goken Kanzaki:A former member of Kyuma's band and his teammate in the Osmosis game.
 Hayato Isomura as Sunato Banda:A serial killer who participates in the Jack of Hearts game with Chishiya and decides to stay in Borderlands at the end of season 2.
 Katsuya Maiguma as Oki Yaba:A con man who participates in the Jack of Hearts game with Chishiya and decides to stay in Borderlands at the end of season 2.
 Kai Inowaki as Enji Matsushita:A sly young man who is later revealed to be the Jack of Hearts in the prison game with Chishiya.
 Honami Satō as Kotoko Shiga:A woman who participates in the Jack of Hearts game with Chishiya.
 Yuzuki Akiyama as Meisa Tokui:A woman who participates in the Jack of Hearts game with Chishiya.
 Yūsaku Mori as Ippei Oki:A timid man who participates in the Jack of Hearts game with Chishiya.
 Yuri Tsunematsu as Akane Heiya:A high school girl skilled in archery who works with Aguni after losing her foot in the Seven of Spades game.
 Ayumi Tanida as Isao Shirabi:The King of Spades, whose game involves him shooting players on sight. Before arriving in the Borderlands, he was a mercenary.
 Chihiro Yamamoto as Risa:A highly athletic woman who is the Queen of Spades and the main opponent in the game "Checkmate".
 Aina Yamada as Urumi Akamaki:A sly, cunning woman who participates in the Jack of Hearts game with Chishiya.
 Jun Hashimoto as Benzo Yashige:A man who participates in the King of Diamonds game with Chishiya.
 Aimi Satsukawa as Hinako Daimon:A woman who participates in the King of Diamonds game with Chishiya.
 Wakato Kanematsu as Takashi Asuma:A man who participates in the King of Diamonds game with Chishiya.
 Miyu Yagyu as Nozomi:A woman who befriends Usagi and a child, Kota.

Episodes

Season 1 (2020)

Season 2 (2022)

Production

Development
On July 16, 2019, Netflix announced that they were creating a live-action adaptation of the manga Alice in Borderland, with Yoshiki Watabe, Yasuko Kuramitsu, and Shinsuke Sato writing the scripts for each episode, and Sato directing in an attempt to make the show appear as "one very, very long film". A few months later, on August 4, Kento Yamazaki and Tao Tsuchiya were cast as the main characters of the series, with the pair appearing as Ryōhei Arisu and Yuzuha Usagi, respectively.

Filming

Filming for the series began as early as August 2019, when Yamazaki was spotted during filming in Dōgenzaka, a district of Shibuya on August 8. The following day, crew members were spotted near a store in Fukutomi-cho, located in the city of Yokohama. From September 17 to 20, Yamazaki and Tsuchiya were seen filming in an apartment complex in front of Kita-Suzurandai Station, on the Shintetsu Arima Line, in the city of Kobe. According to the production company Robot Communications, the show's script was revised to "match the building layout". A scene from the first episode featuring Yamazaki's character, Arisu, meeting his friends Chōta and Karube near Tokyo's busy Shibuya Crossing, was originally supposed to be filmed inside a Starbucks. However, due to the complexity of a glass-covered set, the scene took place in front of a sign outside Shibuya Station. Furthermore, a scene taking place inside Shibuya Station, in which the main characters enter a bathroom and reemerge to an empty Tokyo, was shot in a four-minute continuous take. Extras were recruited for the series from August 9 to December 11, in various cities. The creator of the manga the series is based on, Haro Aso, was allowed to visit various sets. Filming took place in several cities and concluded in December 2019.

Filming for the second season wrapped in March 2022.

Visual effects
During filming, scenes focusing on the empty city of Tokyo were primarily shot using special effects and green screens, with Sato explaining that with the help of his assistant director, he would run into the middle of the intersection of Shibuya Crossing with a small camera "to figure out which parts to actually build and which parts to CGI". Using the Ashikaga Scramble City Studio, a large set 100 kilometers from Tokyo constructed for the series and the film Detective Chinatown 3 (which was filmed during the same period), scenes featuring Shibuya Crossing were filmed using mainly green screens, with "everything but the road and the ticket gate at the east entrance [being] produced with computer graphics". To keep the scenes "authentic", visual effects director Atsushi Doi recreated the shadows of the Tokyu Building where they would normally fall. A scene in episode 4, which showed an underpass being flooded with water, was created with the help of previsualizations, allowing the crew to "experiment with different elements before the actual shoot". The panther that appears in that same episode was created using visual effects developed after the crew visited multiple zoos. Additionally, Academy Award winner Erik-Jan de Boer supervised the production of the tiger featured in episode 5, which was created by Anibrain, an animation studio in India. Post-credit visual effects were added in with the help of Japan's Digital Frontier, who worked alongside teams from Singapore, the United States, and India in an international collaboration.

Music
The score for Alice in Borderland was composed entirely by Yutaka Yamada, who had previously worked with Sato on Bleach (2018) and Kingdom (2019). Produced by Kohei Chida, the music was performed by the FILMharmonic Orchestra of Prague. The song "Good Times", by Jan Erik Nilsson, was featured various times throughout the show.

Marketing and release
On September 18, 2020, Netflix released a teaser video revealing that Alice in Borderland would debut in 190 countries on the platform on December 10, 2020. On October 24, 2020, six set images were released to promote the series. Four days later, an official trailer was issued, along with a poster and a list of the main cast. According to various critics, the first season of Alice in Borderland covered 31 chapters of the original manga, leaving 33 untouched. The first season came out on December 10, and in its first few weeks, it "ranked in the top ten most-watched shows" on the platform in nearly 40 territories, including in Malaysia, Hong Kong, the Philippines, Singapore, Taiwan, Thailand, and Vietnam. Overall, the series did better in countries located in Asia and Europe than those in North America. On December 24, 2020, Netflix renewed the series for a second season, two weeks after the first one had been released.

On October 7, 2020, Haro Aso, the creator of the original manga the series is based on, announced plans to "celebrate" and promote the Netflix series by introducing a new manga, titled Alice in Borderland Retry on Weekly Shōnen Sunday. Launched on October 14 (#46, 2020 of Weekly Shōnen Sunday), the first volume of the manga tankobon was shipped out on December 11, one day after Alice in Borderland premiered. The manga series ended on January 20, 2021 (#8, 2021 of the magazine). The second and final volume of tankobon was released on February 18, 2021. The second season of Alice in Borderland premiered worldwide on December 22, 2022.

Reception
Following its release, Alice in Borderland received mostly positive reviews from critics, who applauded its cinematography, editing, use of graphic violence, visuals, and the performances of Kento Yamazaki and Tao Tsuchiya, but left mixed opinions on its advancement without special focus on character development and its story in general, particularly in the second half. On review aggregator Rotten Tomatoes, the first season of the show holds an approval rating of 75% based on eight reviews, with an average rating of 6.8/10. A month after its release, the first season had accumulated 18 million households in viewership. On Rotten Tomatoes, the second season of Alice in Borderland holds an approval rating of 88% based on eight reviews, with an average rating of 7.1/10.

From The Japan Times, James Hadfield gave praise to Sato's directing but criticized the characters, stating that "few of the cast leave much impression, though Tsuchiya makes for an effective action heroine, and Nijirô Murakami has some fun as a smirking loner." Writing for Ready Steady Cut, Jonathon Wilson gave a generally positive review, lauding the series for skipping over "exposition and careful backstory-building" and "just getting straight to it". Wilson also compared the series positively to the Japanese film Battle Royale and the American horror film Saw. Ars Technica journalist Jennifer Ouellette called the show "emotionally intense" and compared its games to those found in the books Ready Player One and Lord of the Flies, and the 1997 film Cube. Salons Melanie McFarland compared the series to the CBS All Access miniseries The Stand, stating that Alice in Borderland "handles the mechanics of introducing its characters more effectively and it doesn't throw off the audience by leaning heavily on flashbacks [...] but unlike "The Stand," the "before" profiles aren't extensive to the point of dragging on the story's progress." From Yahoo! News, Lim Yian Lu highly praised the series for its "suspenseful plot", stating that it "will keep you entertained and yearning for more despite its grisly and gory scenes." Writing for the Anime News Network, Theron Martin gave the series a C+ and accorded mixed feedback to the show's production, score, general storyline, and acting, while stating that it gives a "modest amount of entertainment" for its runtime. After watching the first episode and praising it for its tone, soundtrack, and ability to "shift gears so fast", the crew at Decider recommended viewers to stream the show.

Awards and nominations

References

External links
 
 

2020 Japanese television series debuts
Japanese-language Netflix original programming
Japanese action television series
Japanese drama television series
Japanese science fiction television series
Japanese supernatural television series
Japanese television dramas based on manga
Japanese thriller television series
Television shows about death games
Television shows set in Tokyo